Daniel Arnall is a television news executive currently running the Nightly News franchise on weekends for NBC News, after taking over for Jamie Kraft who moved to MSNBC. Arnall previously ran the editorial operations at Bloomberg Television's US channel, was previously a senior producer for business coverage at ABC News,  and the senior producer for domestic news at World News with Diane Sawyer. He won an Emmy Award for coverage of troubled pension systems in the United States. Arnall is a graduate of the University of Missouri's School of Journalism and the Graduate School of Journalism at Columbia University.

References

External links 
 Official Twitter

American television news producers
ABC News
Bloomberg L.P. people
Columbia University Graduate School of Journalism alumni
University of Missouri alumni
Living people
Year of birth missing (living people)